Essendant, formerly known as United Stationers, is a national wholesale distributor of office supplies, with consolidated net sales of $5.3 billion. Essendant stocks over 160,000 items including traditional office products, office furniture, janitorial and break room supplies, and technology products. Essendant is headquartered in Deerfield, Illinois, and also has operations in Dubai, United Arab Emirates (UAE).

Products 

Essendant stocks over 160,000 products in these categories:

Janitorial and breakroom suppliesEssendant holds over 25,000 items in the following areas: Janitorial supplies (cleaners and cleaning accessories), breakroom items (food and beverage products), food service consumables (such as disposable cups, plates and utensils), safety and security items, and paper and packaging supplies.

Technology products Essendent stocks over 10,000 items including imaging supplies, data storage, digital cameras, computer accessories and computer hardware items including printers and other peripherals.

Traditional office products Essendant is one of the largest national wholesale distributors of a broad range of office supplies. It carries approximately 23,000 brand name and private label products such as filing and record storage products, business machines, presentation products, writing instruments, paper products, shipping and mailing supplies, calendars and general office accessories.

Industrial supplies Essendant carries approximately 100,000 industrial items including hand and power tools, safety and security supplies, janitorial equipment and supplies, various industrial MRO (maintenance, repair and operations) items, oil field and welding supplies, and automotive aftermarket tools and equipment.

Office furniture Essendant is one of the largest office furniture wholesale distributors in the U.S. It stocks approximately 4,000 products including desks, filing and storage solutions, seating and systems furniture, along with a variety of products for niche markets such as education, government, healthcare and professional services.

Customers 
Essendant serves approximately 30,000 reseller customers. They include independent office products dealers, contract stationers, office products superstores, computer products resellers, office furniture dealers, mass merchandisers, mail order companies, sanitary supply, paper and food service distributors, drug and grocery store chains, healthcare distributors, e-commerce merchants, oil field, welding supply and industrial/MRO distributors, automotive aftermarket dealers and wholesalers and other independent distributors.

Distribution 
Essendant's distribution network allows the company to ship most products overnight to more than 90% of the U.S. and next day delivery to major cities in Canada, with an average line fill rate of approximately 97%. Essendant's domestic operations generate approximately $5.1 billion of its approximately $5.3 billion in 2014 consolidated net sales, with its international operations contributing another $0.2 billion to 2014 net sales. Efficient order processing resulted in a 99.7% order accuracy rate for the year. 

Essendant's network of 68 distribution centers is spread across the nation to facilitate delivery. It has approximately 475 trucks.

Competition 
Essendant participates in highly competitive markets. The company competes with other wholesale distributors as well as with the manufacturers of the products the company sells. In addition, the company competes with warehouse clubs, and the business-to-business sales divisions of national business products resellers.

Essendant competes primarily on the basis of breadth of product lines, availability of products, speed of delivery, order fill rates, net pricing to customers, and the quality of marketing and other value-added services.

Officers 
The current officers of the company include:
 Harry Dochelli, president
 Jeff Bobroff, vice president, merchandising
 Craig Cizek, vice president, pricing
 Tim Engstrom, senior director, operations and logistics
 Andy Kiss, vice president, it
 Marsha Rubin, vice president, general counsel
 Renee Starr, vice president, sales
 Marcela Sztainberg, vice president, hr
 Allison Wadhams, vice president, customer care and sales operations and enablement
 Ryon Wharton, chief financial officer

History

Essendant was incorporated in 1922 under the name Utility Supply Company in Chicago by partners Harry Hecktman and Morris Wolf. During the early 1930s, the company published its first office products catalog. The concept was such a success that the business was further expanded with the opening of its first retail store in 1937. In the early 1950s, in addition to its catalog and retail operation, management recognized growing opportunities in the office products wholesale business. In 1970, the company opened its first distribution center. As time passed, the company found it difficult to compete as both a retailer and wholesaler. So, in 1978, the retail operations were sold and the company began to operate exclusively as an office products wholesaler.

To provide the capital to further its growth, Essendant incorporated and then went public in 1981 as United Stationers Inc. (USTR) on the NASDAQ. In 1984, the company established MicroUnited to capitalize on the growth in the computer supplies sector. The company's MicroUnited division focused on the distribution of peripherals and supplies to computer products resellers. Essendant recognized that its marketing programs and distribution infrastructure would be attractive to customers within other industries.

In June 2002, the company announced that, as part of its succession plan, Richard W. Gochnauer, 52, would become the company's chief operating officer and a member of the board of directors, when he joined the company on July 22. In September 2008, the company pioneered the use of data analytics to illustrate the Value of Wholesale to distribution (aka VOW Program). In December 2010, the company announced that P. Cody Phipps, the company's chief operating officer, would become president and CEO when Richard W. Gochnauer, CEO, retired at the annual shareholders’ meeting in May 2011.

In April 2015, the company announced the departure of P. Cody Phipps, the company's chief executive officer, and Director Robert Blaine Aiken Jr. would take over as interim CEO. In early 2015, the company announced the re-branding of the company to Essendant from United Stationers. The new company name became effective in June 2015. The company's symbol on the NASDAQ Global Select Market changed from USTR to ESND.

July 22, 2015, Essendant announced that its board of directors appointed Robert B. Aiken Jr., president and CEO effective immediately. Mr. Aiken, who had been serving as interim president and CEO since May 2015, would continue as an Essendant board member. On October 25, 2017, the board of directors elected Richard D. Phillips president and chief executive officer, effective immediately. Mr. Phillips, who had been serving as interim president and CEO since June 2017, was also elected to Essendant's board of directors and the board's executive committee. January 31, 2019, the board announced that Harry Dochelli had been named president.

Mergers and acquisitions
As competition in the late 1980s intensified within the office products industry, consolidation at all levels of the industry became commonplace. In June 1992, the company acquired Stationers Distributing Company, a $425 million office products wholesaler in Fort Worth, Texas. This transaction made the company a $1.5 billion wholesale distributor.

In March 1995, the company acquired Associated Stationers, a $475 million general line wholesaler. Three years later, on April 3, 1998, the company acquired Azerty, a $350 million wholesaler of computer consumables. Azerty was founded in April 1983 by Marvin Frackt as the US subsidiary of Inter City Papers Limited of Montreal, Quebec, Canada. Bill Dueger was the first manager of Azerty, reporting to Marvin Frackt. Subsequently, the company's MicroUnited division was merged into Azerty. In July 2000, Essendant increased its geographic penetration in Canada by purchasing Azerty Canada, a $115 million computer consumables business.

To expand their line of business, on October 31, 1996, the company acquired Lagasse Bros., Inc., a wholesaler of janitorial and sanitation supplies. In January 2001, the company completed the acquisition of Peerless Pape to broaden the Lagasse division's reach.

In May 2005, Lagasse completed the purchase of Sweet Paper, which expanded Lagasse's product line and enhanced its scale and infrastructure in key markets. The company decided to sell its Canadian division in March 2006, and completed the sale of certain assets associated with its Canadian division three months later.

The company acquired ORS Nasco, on December 21, 2007. On March 1, 2010, the company acquired their first technology company, privately owned MBS Dev, a Colorado-based software provider. In November 2012, the company signed a stock purchase agreement to acquire 100% of the outstanding shares of O.K.I. Supply Co. (O.K.I.) for an all-cash purchase price of $90 million. On May 29, 2014, the company announced that its wholly owned subsidiary, United Stationers Supply Co., signed an agreement to acquire 100 percent of the outstanding shares of CPO Commerce, Inc., for an all-cash purchase price of $30 million, with up to an additional $10 million to be paid in three years based on performance.

On October 31, 2014, the company completed the acquisition of Liberty Bell Equipment Corporation, a United States wholesaler of auto aftermarket tools and supplies, and its affiliates (collectively, "MEDCO") including G2S Equipment de Fabrication et d'Entretien ULC ("G2S"), a Canadian wholesaler. On December 17, 2014, the company announced the sale of MBSDev to ProjectAX. On August 3, 2015, The company completed the acquisition of Nestor Sales LLC., a wholesaler and distributor of tools, equipment and supplies to the transportation industry. On January 31, 2019, Staples, Inc., announced that an affiliate of Sycamore Partners (which owns Staples) has acquired Essendant, a national wholesale distributor, in an example of vertical integration.

Further reading 
 "Staples and Essendant finalize merger", Digital Commerce 360, January 31, 2019.
 "Essendant cites 'strong growth' in Q2 to online resellers", Digital Commerce 360, August 9, 2018.

References

Companies based in Deerfield, Illinois
Distribution companies of the United States
Companies formerly listed on the Nasdaq
Industrial supply companies
Business services companies established in 1922
1922 establishments in Illinois
1980s initial public offerings
2019 mergers and acquisitions
Staples Inc.